The Dead Texan was an audio-visual musical duo comprising Adam Wiltzie and Christina Vantzou. Wiltzie is better known as one half of the ambient project Stars of the Lid. Vantzou has since released a series of solo albums of ambient music composed for strings and synthesizers.

History
Wiltzie began composing and recording the music on his own and dabbled with combining his music with Vantzou’s videos; this eventually became a mutually collaborative project with the composition of the music and the creation of the videos becoming simultaneous. 
There has been only one Dead Texan release, a self-titled CD/DVD package released on Kranky. The DVD is divided into seven sections which add up to a half hour’s viewing time. The music is similar to that of Stars of the Lid: long, droning, and ambient soundscapes, and reminiscent of the film music of Zbigniew Preisner and Georges Delerue. However, the songs on the album are shorter, and lyrics can be heard at times, unlike Stars of the Lid's songs which are exclusively instrumental. In fact the songs released on The Dead Texan were initially intended to be released as another Stars of the Lid album, but it was ultimately deemed, as Wiltzie put it, "too aggressive."

Discography
The Dead Texan (Kranky, 2004)

See also 
List of ambient music artists

References

External links
Official website.
Biography on Kranky website.
http://www.kranky.net/artists/christinavantzou.html

American post-rock groups
Musical groups from Austin, Texas
American musical duos
Musical groups established in 2004
2004 establishments in Texas